Swanton High School is a public high school in Swanton, Ohio, USA. It is the only high school in the Swanton Local School District.

School details 
In the 2002-2003 school year Swanton High moved into its new school building.

The school' provides for 9th to 12th grades. During the 2005-2006 school year, there were of 145 freshmen, 127 sophomores, 142 juniors and 127 seniors, totalling 541 students. 495 of those students were Caucasian, 9 were Black, 15 Hispanic and 6 of other races. The student-to-teacher ratio was 24.7.

Athletics
Swanton High School's mascot is the Bulldog. Its colors are purple and white. The school is a member of the Northwest Ohio Athletic League. The current athletic director is Wade Haselman.

NWOAL championships (1957-1969, 1978-)
American football: 1981, 1985*, 1989*, 1991, 1995, 2015*
Boys' cross country: 1981, 1982, 1986, 1987, 1988, 1989, 1990, 1991, 1992
Girls' cross country: 1987, 1988, 1989, 1990, 1991, 1992, 2003
Golf: 1992, 1993
Girls' soccer: 2015, 2016, 2020*
Volleyball: 2017, 2020*
Boys' basketball: 1963-64*, 1978–79, 1979–80, 1980-81*, 1981–82, 1987-88*, 2014-15*, 2021–22
Girls' basketball: 1980-81*, 1981–82, 1982–83, 1984-85*, 1988-89*, 1990–91, 2006–07
Wrestling: 1978-79, 1979-80*, 1980-81*, 1981–82, 1982-83*, 1985–86, 1986–87, 1990–91
Baseball: 1965, 1966, 1983, 1984, 1989, 1990*
Boys' track and field: 1987, 1988*, 1989
Girls' track and field: 1979, 1987, 1990, 1991, 1992

[Northern Border League championships (1969-1978)
American football: 1975*, 1976
Boys' cross country: 1970, 1973, 1974
Golf: 1969
Wrestling: 1972-73, 1974–75, 1975–76, 1977-78
Baseball: 1970*, 1972*
Boys' track and field: 1974
Girls' track and field: 1977, 1978

Note: shared league titles are denoted with an asterisk (*)

Band
The Swanton High School marching band and concert band are members of class "C" in the Ohio Music Education Association. The band hosts a yearly marching band competition called "The Bulldog Bowl".

Notable alumni

 Fred Sturt - NFL football player
 Emerson Cole - member of 1950 NFL Champion Cleveland Browns
 Bernard Benton - former WBC cruiserweight champion
 Paul Schudel - NCAA football coach
 Karl Koepfer - former NFL football player
 Gary Jones - costume designer and Academy Award nominee

Notes and references

External links
 Swanton High School's football web page

High schools in Fulton County, Ohio
Public high schools in Ohio